Lt. Gen. Ronald T. Kadish, Ret. (born April 6, 1948) is a United States Air Force officer who rose to head the Ballistic Missile Defense Organization and the Missile Defense Agency within the United States Department of Defense.

Biography
Born in Kingston, Pennsylvania, Kadish attended the Cardinal O'Hara High School and earned a bachelor's degree in chemistry in 1970 from St. Joseph's University in Philadelphia and joined the Air Force through the OTS program. He trained as a pilot on the C-130E aircraft and, as a pilot and instructor, logged over 2,500 flight hours.

By the early 1990s, Kadish had risen through the ranks to the posts of Program Director of the F-15, F-16, and C-17 programs at Wright-Patterson Air Force Base. From 1996 to 1999, he commanded the Electronic Systems Center at Hanscom Air Force Base, and in 1999 was named director of the Ballistic Missile Defense Organization in The Pentagon.

From January 2002 until his retirement in September 2004, Kadish headed the Missile Defense Agency. His name was circulated as a possible NASA administrator following the 2004 resignation of Sean O'Keefe. He now works at Booz Allen Hamilton.

Awards and decorations

External links

References 

United States Air Force generals
1948 births
Living people
Saint Joseph's University alumni
Recipients of the Legion of Merit
Missile Defense Agency
Recipients of the Defense Distinguished Service Medal
Recipients of the Air Force Distinguished Service Medal
Booz Allen Hamilton people